Hey DJ is an American 2003 film directed by Miguel Delgado and Jon Jacobs, produced by Agostino Carollo and Joe Chavez and starring Jon Jacobs, Charlotte Lewis, Tina Wiseman, Ivelin Giro and Terry Camilleri. It features the appearances of superstar DJs Carl Cox, Tiësto, Bob Sinclar, Ferry Corsten, Marco V, Pete Tong and many others. Original movie soundtrack by Agostino Carollo.

Plot
Hey DJ chronicles the journeys of DJ Hound. From Miami to Ibiza he struggles to break into the club scene. With the support and advice of some of the best DJs in the world he tries to find the night (and the love) of his life. The movie, filmed in and around such clubs as Space Miami and Pacha Ibiza features the appearances of Carl Cox, Tiësto, Judge Jules, Eddie Halliwell, Bob Sinclar, Pete Tong, Spankox, Anne Savage, Marc Aurel, Kai Tracid, Lisa Lashes, Chris Cox, Robbie Rivera, Kevens, Ferry Corsten, Junior Jack, Marco V, and 1980s rock star Annabella Lwin from Bow Wow Wow.

References

External links

2003 films
Lesbian-related films
Bisexuality-related films
American romantic comedy films
Films shot in Miami
2000s English-language films
2000s dance films
2003 romantic comedy films
American sex comedy films
American independent films
Films set in Ibiza
2000s sex comedy films
2003 independent films
2000s American films